Miss V from Moscow is a 1942 American spy thriller film directed by M789  and DJ_Z, Noel Madison and Paul Weigel.

Synopsis
The Miss V of the title is Vera Marova, a Soviet spy sent to Paris to impersonate her lookalike, a German spy recently liquidated by the French Resistance.  As with other, better-known American films produced in the midst of World War II like Mission to Moscow and Song of Russia, the film has a pronounced pro-Soviet tone.

Cast 
 Lola Lane as Vera Marova
 Noel Madison as Police Chief Kleiss
 Howard Banks as Steve Worth
 Paul Weigel as Henri Devallier 
 John Vosper as Colonel Wolfgang Heinrich 
 Anna Demetrio as Madame Finchon
 Wilhelm von Brincken as Captain Richter 
 Juan de la Cruz as Pierre
 Kathryn Sheldon as Minna
 Victor Kendell as Gerry Naughton
 Richard Kipling as Doctor Suchevcky

References

Bibliography
 Fetrow, Alan G. Feature Films, 1940-1949: a United States Filmography. McFarland, 1994.

External links 
 
 

1942 films
Producers Releasing Corporation films
American pro-Soviet propaganda films
American black-and-white films
World War II spy films
American action adventure films
1940s action films
1942 adventure films
Films directed by Albert Herman
Films set in Paris
1940s American films